Edward Taylor, (born  1931) is a British dramatist and radio producer best known for the BBC Radio Comedy series The Men from the Ministry.

Originally intending to seek a career in acting, Taylor applied to join Cambridge University,  appearing in the 1955 Cambridge Footlights revue and becoming a scriptwriter after being noticed by a BBC talent scout and hired for a one-year contract. Taylor's career with the BBC subsequently lasted for 36 years, during which he wrote a total of 2,300 programmes. He also produced several shows, not just situation comedies that he had written (or co-written) himself but also comedy panel games, including some editions of Just a Minute.

Taylor came up with the idea for The Men from the Ministry after a lunch with actor friend Richard Murdoch in the early 1960s, during which Murdoch asked Taylor to write a comedy for him to appear in.

The Men from the Ministry ran for 144 episodes and versions were also produced in South Africa, Sweden and Finland, Taylor continuing to write additional episodes for the Finnish version right up to 2008.

In 1992, Taylor wrote the stage thriller Murder by Misadventure that appeared at the Vaudeville Theatre and then the Whitehall Theatre in London's West End. The play starred Gerald Harper as Harold and William Gaunt as Riggs as a pair of television crime writers, one of whom wishes to end the partnership.

Taylor currently lives in London with his wife Sue. They have a daughter, Imogen.

External links
Helsingin Sanomat interview with scriptwriter Edward Taylor

1931 births
British comedy writers
Living people